Olivella dama is a species of small sea snail, marine gastropod mollusk in the subfamily Olivellinae, in the family Olividae, the olives.  Species in the genus Olivella are commonly called dwarf olives.

Description
The shell is whiteish, with a very acute spire, nearly as long as the aperture. The middle of the body whorl is marked by angulated brown lines: the suture has spots and fascicles of longitudinal stripes: the basal belt is very broad: the aperture purple.

Distribution
Gulf of California area, West coast of North America.

References

dama
Gastropods described in 1828